Benamocarra is a town and municipality in the Province of Málaga, part of the autonomous community of Andalusia in southern Spain. The municipality is situated approximately 5 kilometres from Vélez-Málaga and 41 from Málaga, the provincial capital. It has a population of approximately 3,000 residents. The natives are called Benamocarreños.

Its mayor since 2003 (reelected in 2007) is Abdeslam Jesús Aoulad Ben Salem Lucena of the Partido Andalucista. He was the first, and still is the only, Spanish mayor of Moroccan origin. He is a member of the National Executive of the P.A., and was candidate for this party at the 2008 autonomous elections.

References

Municipalities in the Province of Málaga